Headache: The Journal of Head and Face Pain is a peer-reviewed medical journal covering all aspects of head and face pain. It is the official journal of the American Headache Society (https://americanheadachesociety.org). It was established in 1961 and is published ten times per year by Wiley-Blackwell. The editor-in-chief is Amy A. Gelfand MD, MAS, FAHS (University of California at San Francisco). According to the Journal Citation Reports, the journal has a 2021 impact factor of 4.041, ranking it 45th out of 204 journals in the category "Clinical Neurology".

References

External links
 

Neurology journals
Anesthesiology and palliative medicine journals
Wiley-Blackwell academic journals
Publications established in 1961
10 times per year journals